Business and Professional Communication Quarterly is a quarterly peer-reviewed academic journal covering communication management. The editor-in-chief is Melinda Knight (Montclair State University). It was established in 1969 as Business Communication Quarterly, obtaining its current title in 2014, and is published by SAGE Publishing in association with the Association for Business Communication.

Abstracting and indexing
The journal is abstracted and indexed in:
 ERIC
 EBSCO databases
 Emerging Sources Citation Index
 ProQuest databases
 Scopus

References

External links 
 

SAGE Publishing academic journals
English-language journals
Business and management journals
Quarterly journals
Publications established in 1969
Communication journals